The Fondazione Palazzo Strozzi (Foundation of the Palazzo Strozzi) is the first example of an independent public-private cultural foundation in Italy, established in 2006.  Is a cultural organisation in the Palazzo Strozzi, Florence, Italy, that each year mounts exhibitions devoted to a different aspect of the arts, creating a dialogue between the old and the new.

The Fondazione Palazzo Strozzi in Florence is rappresented in the USA by the Palazzo Strozzi Foundation USA, a non profit organization based in New York member of the Circle of the Committee of the Partners of Palazzo Strozzi.

References

Culture in Florence
Foundations based in Italy
2006 establishments in Italy

Arts foundations based in Europe
Arts foundations based in Italy